This is a list of events taking place in 2022 relating to Scottish television.

Events

1 January – BBC Scotland's Hogmanay to be hosted by Edith Bowman to see in the New Year.
24 September – River City celebrates its 20th anniversary.
 November – STV launches Night Vision, which features news, sport and weather from across Scotland. Previously, STV had broadcast ITV's overnight filler programme Unwind with ITV (which was branded by STV as Unwind with STV).

Ongoing television programmes

1960s
Reporting Scotland (1968–1983; 1984–present)

1970s
Sportscene (1975–present)
Landward (1976–present)
The Beechgrove Garden (1978–present)

1990s
Eòrpa (1993–present)

2000s
River City (2002–present)
The Adventure Show (2005–present)
An Là (2008–present)
Trusadh (2008–present)
STV Rugby (2009–2010; 2011–present)
STV News at Six (2009–present)

2010s
Scotland Tonight (2011–present)
Shetland (2013–present)
Scot Squad (2014–present)
Two Doors Down (2016–present)
The Nine (2019–present)
Debate Night (2019–present)
A View from the Terrace (2019–present)

Ending this year
Molly and Mack (2018–2022)

Deaths
2 March – John Stahl, actor (born 1953)

See also
2022 in Scotland

References

2022 in Scottish television
Television in Scotland by year